Nationality words link to articles with information on the nation's poetry or literature (for instance, Irish or France).

Events

870:
 Approximate date of completion of the Muspilli
 Approximate date of the Kakawin Rāmâyaṇa

Works published

Births
Death years link to the corresponding "[year] in poetry" article. There are conflicting or unreliable sources for the birth years of many people born in this period; where sources conflict, the poet is listed again and the conflict is noted:

872:
 Ki no Tsurayuki  (died 945), Japanese waka poet

873:
 Fujiwara no Sadakata (died 932), Japanese poet

875:
 Lady Ise (died 938), a prominent woman waka poet

877:
 Fujiwara no Kanesuke (died 933), one of the Thirty-six Poetry Immortals of Japan

Deaths
Birth years link to the corresponding "[year] in poetry" article:

870:
 Wen Tingyun (born 812), Chinese lyricist of the late Tang Dynasty who helped establish the Ci in chinese poetry

877:
 Johannes Scotus Eriugena (born 815), among the last Hiberno-Latin poets

878:
 King Amoghavarsha I, of the Rashtrakuta Dynasty, (born 800), king and Kannada poet

See also

 Poetry
 9th century in poetry
 9th century in literature
 List of years in poetry

Other events:
 Other events of the 12th century
 Other events of the 13th century

9th century:
 9th century in poetry
 9th century in literature

Notes

Poetry by year
Poetry
9th-century literature